Medveščak may refer to:

 Gornji Grad – Medveščak, city district in Zagreb, Croatia
 Medveščak (stream), a historic creek in central Zagreb, today running underground in the aforementioned city district
 Medveščak (neighborhood), a neighborhood in the aforementioned city district
 RK Medveščak, a handball club based in Zagreb
 KHL Medveščak Zagreb, an ice hockey club based in Zagreb